The 2014 San Francisco 49ers season was the franchise's 65th season in the National Football League (NFL), the 69th overall and the fourth under the head coach/general manager tandem of Jim Harbaugh and Trent Baalke. It also marked the 49ers' inaugural season playing their home games at Levi's Stadium in Santa Clara, California.

The 49ers were favorites to make another Super Bowl run at the beginning of the season. However despite a 7-4 start, the 49ers suffered a late-season collapse, losing four of their final five games, and failing to improve on their 12–4 record from 2013. With their loss to the Seattle Seahawks in Week 15, the 49ers were mathematically eliminated from the postseason, and did not qualify for the first time since 2010. After the season ended, it was announced that Jim Harbaugh and the 49ers mutually agreed to end his contract with the team, which Harbaugh later disputed.

Despite missing significant starters on the defensive side of the ball due to injuries for most of the season (including Pro-Bowlers NaVorro Bowman and Patrick Willis), the 49ers still finished with the NFL's fifth ranked defense in terms of total yards. They also led the league in interceptions with 23, led by cornerback Perrish Cox, who had five. The 49ers defense also finished fourth in the league in total takeaways with 29. The offense, on the other hand, struggled mightily. The 49ers finished 30th in passing yards per game, 25th in the league averaging just 19.1 points per game, while Colin Kaepernick was sacked 52 times during the season, a team record. From Weeks 7–15, the 49ers averaged just 13.8 points per game, last in the league. During that same stretch, they hit the twenty-point mark just once. They were also outscored by 81 points in the second half of games, and scored just one offensive touchdown in the fourth quarter all year. As a result, offensive coordinator Greg Roman was fired after the season ended.

Offseason

Roster changes

Free agents

Signings

Departures

2014 NFL draft

Notes
 The 49ers acquired an additional second-round selection (No. 56 overall) as part of a trade that sent quarterback Alex Smith to the Kansas City Chiefs. The Chiefs originally sent a third-round selection to the 49ers, however, the selection was upgraded to a second-rounder after a condition was met in which the Chiefs won a minimum of eight games during the  season.
 The Broncos traded their second- and fifth-round selections in 2014 (Nos. 63 and 171 overall, respectively) as well a fifth-round selection in the 2015 NFL Draft to the 49ers in exchange for a second- and seventh-round selection (Nos. 56 and 242 overall).
 The 49ers traded the second- and fifth-round selections they acquired from Denver to Miami in exchange for Miami's second-round selection (No. 57 overall)
 Jacksonville traded their third- and fifth-round selections (Nos. 70 and 150 overall) to the 49ers in exchange for the 49ers second-round selection (No. 61 overall).
 The 49ers acquired an additional third-round selection (No. 77 overall) as part of a trade that sent their 2013 third-round selection to the Tennessee Titans.
 Cleveland traded their fourth- and sixth-round selections (Nos. 106 and 180 overall) to the 49ers in exchange for the 49ers third-round selection (No. 95 overall).
 The 49ers traded their sixth-round selection (No. 205 overall) to the Jacksonville Jaguars in exchange for quarterback Blaine Gabbert.
 The 49ers acquired an additional seventh-round selection as (No. 242 overall) part of a trade that sent linebacker Parys Haralson to the New Orleans Saints.
 The 49ers acquired an additional seventh-round selection (No. 243 overall) as part of a trade that sent safety Colin Jones to the Carolina Panthers.

Undrafted free agents

Staff

Final roster

Schedule

Preseason

Regular season
San Francisco began the season strong at 4–2, but struggled heavily down the stretch as they lost 6 of their last 10 to fall out of contention. The 49ers entered the season looking to improve on their 12–4 record from the previous year, but by Week 9 had exceeded their loss total from the season before and had a non-winning record for the first time since their 2010 campaign. In Week 15, the 49ers were eliminated from playoff contention with a loss to Seattle. Although the 49ers has the fourth ranked defense in the league for 2014, the 49ers offense finished at the bottom five in many offensive categories. From Weeks 7–15, the 49ers were last in the league in points scored, averaging 13.9 points per game and scoring 20 or more points just once (in a Week 10 win against New Orleans). Colin Kaepernick was sacked more than 30 times during that stretch and the 49ers were outscored in the second half of 7 out of those 8 games by a wide margin.

Game summaries

Week 1: at Dallas Cowboys

Game Notes
The 49ers scored touchdowns on each of three Cowboys turnovers, all in the first quarter. Even though the Cowboys held a significant edge in 1st-quarter time of possession (13:26 to 1:34), the 49ers had a 21–3 lead due to the turnovers. With the 49ers up 28–3, the Cowboys found themselves with their largest halftime deficit in a home opener ever. Although the 49ers did not score again in the second half, they held the Cowboys to only 14 more points, and won the game.

Week 2: vs. Chicago Bears

In a pattern similar to the Dallas game of week one, the Niners jumped out to an early 17–0 lead, only to fall victim to a hailstorm of penalties, turnovers and a strong Bears comeback, 28–20. A blocked punt led to a Niner touchdown in the third minute of the game, but a seven-minute drive later in the quarter stalled in the red zone and only yielded a field goal. After a short punt in the second quarter, the Niners scored a second touchdown, but Chicago answered with their first touchdown just before halftime. To start the third quarter, the Niners held the ball for more than nine minutes. But they once again failed in the red zone, and settled for another field goal. The Bears scored three touchdowns in the second half to emerge with the win. The Niners were called on 16 penalties for 118 yards, losing one touchdown run, and keeping Bears' drives alive on multiple occasions.  Colin Kaepernick threw three interceptions, lost a fumble, and was called for unsportsmanlike conduct after an interception. The Niners outgained Chicago 361–216, and held the Bears to only 46 rushing yards, but the overwhelming weight of the turnovers and penalties negated any other advantage. The Bears scored touchdowns the last four times they had the ball. This was also the first time since 1985 that the Bears won a road game against the 49ers, ending the Bears' 8-game road losing streak against the 49ers (the Bears were outscored in those 8 losses by a score of 271 to 49).

Week 3: at Arizona Cardinals

For the third straight game, the Niners jumped out to an early lead, only to be shut out for the remainder of the game. And for the second straight game, mistakes and penalties allowed their opponent to take the victory. The Niners had pulled out to a 14–6 lead with 5:07 remaining in the second quarter, but saw the Cardinals score 17 unanswered points for a 23–14 victory. The Niners failed to score the last six times they had the ball, and racked up nine penalties for 107 yards, mostly in the second half.

Week 4: vs. Philadelphia Eagles

The Niners broke the pattern of their first three games, and mounted a second-half comeback to beat the Eagles (the 49ers trailed 21–10 in the second quarter). Philadelphia exploited Niner mistakes to score first-half touchdowns on a blocked punt recovery, an interception return and a punt return. But the defense never allowed a point by the Eagles offense, who had led the league in scoring through the first 3 weeks of the season, and on the strength of two Colin Kaepernick touchdown passes and four Phil Dawson field goals, the 49ers took a late 26–21 lead. Late in the game the Eagles moved to the Niner one-yard line, but they turned the ball over on downs, and the Niners held on for the win. The Niners outgained the Eagles 407–213, and held the ball for 42:17.

Week 5: vs. Kansas City Chiefs

In a game that saw the return of former 49er QB Alex Smith to the Bay Area, the Niners prevailed in a see-saw game, 22–17, on the strength of five Phil Dawson field goals. Kansas City took an early lead on a touchdown pass from Smith to Travis Kelce, but Colin Kaepernick hit Stevie Johnson with a TD pass just before halftime to give the 49ers a 13–10 lead. Smith struck again in the third quarter with a 17-yard scoring pass to De'Anthony Thomas, but Dawson hit three more field goals to give the Niners the win. The Niners outgained the Chiefs 357–264, and had a 36:04–23:56 time of possession advantage, but they only scored one touchdown in four trips into the red zone, continuing their season-long problem in that area.

Week 6: at St. Louis Rams

After trailing 14–0 in the 1st quarter, the 49ers completely turned the game around, outscoring the Rams 31–3 and winning by a score of 31–17. With :24 left in the first half, the 49ers down 14–3 and getting outplayed on both sides of the ball, Colin Kaepernick hit Brandon Lloyd for an 80-yard touchdown pass that turned the game around and gave the 49ers the momentum. Kaepernick threw for 343 yards and 3 touchdowns and Anquan Boldin had 7 catches for 94 yards and a touchdown. The 49ers defense recorded 5 sacks, matching their season total. It was the first time since 1986 that the 49ers trailed by double digits and then won by double digits (last time was October 26, 1986, vs Green Bay). This was also the second time this season the 49ers erased a double-digit deficit and won. (Week 4 vs. Eagles)

Week 7: at Denver Broncos

Behind Peyton Manning's four touchdown passes, the Broncos scored early and often, and administered a sound thrashing to the Niners, 42–17. After a Colin Kaepernick to Stevie Johnson touchdown pass closed the halftime margin to 21–10, Denver exploded for three unanswered touchdowns in the third quarter to put the game away early. Manning was 22 of 26 for 318 yards and four touchdowns, with an almost-perfect quarterback rating of 157.2, as this was one of the worst displays of pass defense by the Niners in history. The Bronco defense held the Niners to 62 yards rushing and totally overwhelmed the offensive line.

Week 9: vs. St. Louis Rams

Colin Kaepernick fumbled the ball on a quarterback sneak at the Rams 1-yard line with less than 10 seconds remaining in the game, and the Rams held on to upset the Niners, 13–10. The game was a defensive struggle, with both touchdowns scored on drives of less than 40 yards. The 49ers offense continued to struggle, not registering a single point in the 2nd half.

Week 10: at New Orleans Saints

With the season on the line, the 49ers got off to a quick start, leading 14–0 in the first quarter with a pair of rushing touchdowns by Frank Gore and Carlos Hyde. The Saints rebounded in the 2nd half to take a 24–21 lead. With 1:34 to go, and the 49ers facing 4th and 10 from their own 22-yard line, Colin Kaepernick found a wide open Michael Crabtree for a 51-yard gain that set up the game-tying field goal. On the last play of regulation, the Saints appeared to have scored on a Hail Mary pass from Drew Brees, but the play was overturned by offensive pass interference. In overtime, Ahmad Brooks sacked Brees, causing a fumble recovered by the 49ers' Chris Borland on the Saints' 17. On the very next play, Phil Dawson kicked the game-winning field goal, giving the Niners a 27–24 win. This was the Saints' first home loss in 12 games, and the first home loss under Sean Payton in 20 games (Payton was suspended for all of the 2012 season).

Week 11: at New York Giants

With the 49ers offense continuing to struggle in the game, the defense more than made up for it. The 49ers defense intercepted Giants QB Eli Manning 5 times and sacked him twice. In the 4th quarter, with the 49ers holding a 16–10 lead, the Giants marched down the field to the 49ers' 4-yard line with 5:25 left to play. The 49ers defense forced 3 incomplete passes and rookie linebacker Chris Borland intercepted Eli Manning's throw on 4th and goal to preserve the win. This was the second time this season the 49ers defense had a goal line stand late in a game (Week 4 vs Eagles). Colin Kaepernick went 15/29 for 193 yards and a touchdown pass. Frank Gore had 19 carries for 95 yards. With the win, the 49ers moved to 6–4 on the season.

Week 12: vs. Washington Redskins

Carlos Hyde scored a rare fourth-quarter touchdown for the Niners, and allowed them to hold off the Redskins, 17–13.

Week 13: vs. Seattle Seahawks
Thanksgiving Day game

The Thanksgiving night matchup against Seattle on national television resulted in a Seahawks win. While the defense held Seattle to a touchdown and four field goals, the Niners only managed 164 yards of offense and one third-quarter field goal. The offense, which traditionally collapsed this season in the face of second-half adjustments, never got on track at all, averaging 3.2 yards per pass and 3.6 yards per rush. Two Colin Kaepernick interceptions and a Perrish Cox fumble were the difference in the game. After the game, 49ers owner Jed York apologized to fans on Twitter for his team's poor performance.

Week 14: at Oakland Raiders

The Niners were defeated by local rival Oakland. One of the league's worst defenses dominated the Niner offense. The Niners went into halftime tied at 10 after a 52-yard field goal by Phil Dawson with one second remaining, and briefly led, 13–10 in the third quarter on another Dawson kick. Consecutive 80-yard touchdown drives in the second half by the Raiders condemned the Niners to defeat.

Week 15: at Seattle Seahawks

For the first time in the Jim Harbaugh era, the 49ers lost their third consecutive game. The Niners were several point underdogs in this game, but managed to stay competitive throughout thanks to their defense. They sacked Russell Wilson five times, intercepted him once and held him to just 168 passing yards, while pressuring him throughout the game. But despite a second-quarter touchdown by Frank Gore that gave them the lead at halftime, the offense was ineffective, and could not find a rhythm. This was the seventh time in the last eight games the 49ers offense failed to score at least 20 points. Since week 7, the 49ers were last in the league in scoring (13.7 points per game). With this loss the 49ers were eliminated from playoff contention.

Week 16: vs. San Diego Chargers

The 49ers dominated the first half and led 28–7 at halftime.  However, their second-half offense stalled while the defense fell apart as the 49ers squandered a 21-point 3rd-quarter lead and a 14-point lead in the final minutes of the 4th quarter.  The Chargers outscored the 49ers 31–7 after halftime.  Trailing 35–28, the Chargers drove down the field for the game-tying touchdown, converting two 4th downs on that drive.  The 49ers attempted to win in the final seconds of regulation, but Phil Dawson's 60-yard kick was way off.  The game went to overtime.  The 49ers got the ball first, but a fumble by Quinton Patton allowed the Chargers to have possession on their own 40.  The Chargers drove to the 49ers' 22-yard line before kicking a field goal to hand the 49ers their fourth straight loss. The 49ers rushed for an astonishing 355 yards, including a 52-yard touchdown run by Frank Gore and a 90-yard touchdown run by Colin Kaepernick. The 49ers set an NFL record for most rushing yards in a loss The 49ers also scored 35 points, a season high.  However, their offensive struggles in the second half of games continued.  During the four-game losing streak, the 49ers scored only 13 points in the second half of their games (outscored 65–13 by opponents in the second half of those games).  With the loss the 49ers fell to 7–8, ensuring that they would finish without a winning record for the first time since the 2010 season.

Week 17: vs. Arizona Cardinals

A strong defensive showing overcame the usual second-half collapse by the offense, and the Niners held on for a 20–17 win, to even their season record at 8–8. The 49ers defense intercepted Cardinals QB Ryan Lindley three times and sacked him twice, shutting Arizona out in the second half. Phil Dawson kicked two field goals, and Bruce Miller caught a three-yard touchdown pass in the third quarter for the margin of victory. Frank Gore, who needed just 38 yards to reach 1,000 rushing yards on the year, rushed for 144 yards on 25 carries. It was the eighth time in his career that he rushed for 1,000 yards in a season. 49ers wideout Anquan Boldin caught a 76-yard touchdown pass, giving him over 1,000 yards receiving for the year.  This was the last game coached by 49ers head coach Jim Harbaugh, as he and the 49ers front office mutually agreed to cut ties after the game.

Standings

Division

Conference

Levi's Stadium parking issues
In November 2013, Levi's Stadium and 49ers officials initially requested the NFL not to schedule any weekday home games during the preseason or regular season – including Monday and Thursday Night Football – during Levi's Stadium's inaugural season, due to parking issues in the Santa Clara area during weekdays. However, the NFL decided not to schedule any weeknight prime-time games at Levi's Stadium during the 2014 season, with the exception of the Week 13 Thanksgiving game, until traffic flow within the area was figured out.

Notes

References

External links
 
 

San Francisco
San Francisco 49ers seasons
San
2014 in San Francisco